Pentacarbon dioxide, officially penta-1,2,3,4-tetraene-1,5-dione, is an oxide of carbon (an oxocarbon) with formula C5O2 or O=C=C=C=C=C=O.

The compound was described in 1988 by Günter Maier and others, who obtained it by pyrolysis of cyclohexane-1,3,5-trione (phloroglucin, the tautomeric form of phloroglucinol). It has also been obtained by flash vapor pyrolysis of 2,4,6-tris(diazo)cyclohexane-1,3,5-trione (C6N6O3). It is stable at room temperature in solution. The pure compound is stable up to −96 °C, at which point it polymerizes.

References

See also
 Ethylene dione (C2O2)
 Carbon suboxide (C3O2)

Oxocarbons
Heterocumulenes
Enones
Ketenes
Diketones
Substances discovered in the 1980s